Crispin John Orion Gray (born 1963) is an English guitarist and songwriter. Best known for his bands Daisy Chainsaw and Queenadreena, Gray has also played with Dizzy Q Viper, Vapid Dolly and The Dogbones. He is currently a member of Starsha Lee. His great uncle was British poet John Gray, allegedly the inspiration for Oscar Wilde's The Picture of Dorian Gray. In November 2022, Gray released his first ever solo project, Alien Airforce, via Public Pressure.

Discography

Daisy Chainsaw
LoveSickPleasure EP (1991), Deva Records
Pink Flower EP (1992), Deva Records
Hope Your Dreams Come True EP (1992), Deva Records
Eleventeen (1992), One Little Indian Records
For They Know Not What They Do (1994), One Little Indian Records
You're Gruesome EP (1995), Fluffy Bunny Records/Cheapskates Records

Dizzy Q Viper
Losers Like You EP (1996), Blue Angel Records
Uncle Cracking Bone EP (1996), Blue Angel Records

Vapid Dolly
The Queen of Pseudo Psychos (1997), Epic/Sony

Queenadreena
 Taxidermy (2000), Blanco y Negro Records
 Drink Me (2002), Rough Trade Records
 The Butcher and the Butterfly (2005), One Little Indian Records
 Live at the ICA (2005), One Little Indian Records
 Ride A Cock Horse (2007), Independently Released
 Djin (2008), Imperial Records

The Dogbones
 The Dogbones (2010), Buzzsaw Records

Ultra Grand Supreme
 Antiques Rock Show (2017), Digital Only

Starsha Lee
 Post-God Metaphysics (2018), Syndicol Music
 Plausible Hate EP (2018), Syndicol Music
 Love Is Superficial EP (2019), Cadiz Entertainment
 Killing Heteronomy (2021), Digital Only
 Resting In Murder (2022), Digital Only
 Damnatio Memoriae EP (2022), Cadiz Entertainment

Alien Airforce
 One EP (2022), Public Pressure

References

External links

English rock guitarists
English male guitarists
English songwriters
Living people
1963 births
British male songwriters